Klong that are large barrel drums used in the classical music of Thailand. They are played with large wooden sticks. They are usually played in a pair and used in the piphat ensemble. Drums of this kind have also been called klong chatri (กลองชาตรี) and klong túk (กลองตุ๊ก).

A similar drum, called skor thom, is used in Cambodian classical music.

External links
Klong that page

See also
Traditional Thai musical instruments

References

Thai musical instruments